Maw-Kuen Wu (born December 6, 1949) is a Taiwanese physicist specializing in superconductivity, low-temperature physics, and high-pressure physics. He was a professor of physics at University of Alabama (Huntsville), Columbia University, and National Tsing Hua University, the Director of the Institute of Physics at Academia Sinica, the president of the National Dong Hwa University, and is currently a distinguished research fellow of the Institute of Physics, Academia Sinica.

Life and career
Born in Yuli Township, Hualien County, Wu is an ethnic Hokkien on his paternal side and spent his childhood in Taiwan. He completed his Ph.D. degree at the University of Houston in 1981.

Wu worked as a research scientist at his alma mater for two years, before being taken on as an assistant professor of physics at the University of Alabama in Huntsville, and then subsequently promoted to professor in 1987. Along with Chu Ching-wu and  Jim Ashburn, Wu made the historic discovery of superconductivity above 77 K in YBCO in 1987. According to the Science Citation Index by Web of Science, Wu's 1987 work "Superconductivity at 93 K in a new mixed-phase Y-Ba-Cu-O compound system at ambient pressure" in Physical Review Letters (American Physical Society) has been cited for more than five thousand times by journal articles and considered influential in applied science and business.
Wu was then invited to teach at the National Tsing Hua University, and conduct further research in high-temperature superconductivity.

Maw-Kuen Wu served as Chairman of the R.O.C. National Science Council from 2004 to 2006. In 2018, he was named Minister of Education and resigned after 41 days. Wu was subsequently impeached by the Control Yuan, which charged him with violating the Public Functionary Service Act and the Act on the Recusal of Public Servants Due to Conflict of Interest.

Personal life
Maw-Kuen Wu and his wife have two children.

Academic Honors
 1988 USA Chinese Association of Engineering Annual Award
 1988 State of Alabama Resolution
 1988 University of Alabama Research Award
 1988 U.S.A. National Academy of Sciences Comstock Prize
 1989 Tamkang Golden Eagle Award
 1994 Fellow, Chinese Physical Society
 1994 Bernd T. Matthias Prize
 1995 Y. T. Lee Outstanding Scientist Award
 1998 NASA Special Awards
 2007 Ettore Majorana-Erice-Science for Peace Prize
 2009 Taiwanese-American Foundation (TAF) Award
 2010-03 Germany Humboldt Research Award

References

External links

 Professor Wu's profile at Academia Sinica

1949 births
Living people
Politicians of the Republic of China on Taiwan from Hualien County
Taiwanese people of Hoklo descent
Tamkang University alumni
University of Houston alumni
20th-century Taiwanese physicists
National Cheng Kung University alumni
University of Houston faculty
University of Alabama in Huntsville faculty
Columbia University faculty
Academic staff of the National Tsing Hua University
Academic staff of the National Dong Hwa University
Members of Academia Sinica
Foreign associates of the National Academy of Sciences
Presidents of universities and colleges in Taiwan
Hokkien scientists
Ministers of Science and Technology of the Republic of China
Taiwanese Ministers of Education
Humboldt Research Award recipients
21st-century Taiwanese physicists